François or Frans Peeraer (15 February 1913 – 28 March 1988) was a Belgian footballer.

Biography 
Playing as a midfielder at Royal Antwerp FC in the 1930s, he won three caps for Belgium in 1934. He played one match during the World Cup of the same year.

Honours 
 Belgian international in 1934 (2 caps)
 Participation in the 1934 World Cup (1 match played)

References

External links
 

1913 births
1988 deaths
Belgian footballers
Belgium international footballers
1934 FIFA World Cup players
Royal Antwerp F.C. players
Footballers from Antwerp
Association football midfielders